ZooMoo is an international multilanguage pay television channel owned by Rock Entertainment Holdings that was first launched in Brazil in September 2013 in high definition (HD). On 4 April 2014, ZooMoo was launched in Singapore via Starhub. The ZooMoo brand name is also used for international programming blocks broadcasting ZooMoo's original programming.

ZooMoo features puppetry, animations, games, music, puzzles and activities. Programming on the channel is a blend of in-house original productions and acquired programming such as Jelly Jamm and Miss Spider's Sunny Patch Friends.

In 2016, Canadian-based Blue Ant Media acquired a majority stake in the channel.

On 25 May 2018, the channel was launched in the Philippines on Easy TV Home.

The channel launched on Virgin Media channels 295 and 739 on 21 July 2018. A temporary duplicate of the SD channel launched a day later following the removal of the UKTV network of channels, taking the slot held by Eden +1, until they returned on 11 August 2018. The SD version was removed from channel 295 a few days later. The HD channel was removed from Virgin Media on 7 January 2020, the same day as 5Spike and VH1. The UK channel later closed in the same year.

On 1 December 2018, a ZooMoo programming block was launched on Cignal's exclusive channel, Colours.

In Latin America, Brazil and the United States, ZooMoo is operated by AMC Networks International. Currently, the United States and Latin America share a ZooMoo feed, which is available in English and Spanish. The Brazilian feed, known as "ZooMoo Kids," features some exclusive shows produced in Brazil, and only features programming in Portuguese.

On 1 April 2020, it was launched on Zuku TV in Kenya and 6 months later on DStv as a "pop-up channel" which has been extended from March to the end of June 2021.

On 16 June 2020, Your Family Entertainment and Blue Ant Media made a "content swap" agreement which enabled an exchange of programming between the YFE catalog and the international ZooMoo channels to occur. As a result, ZooMoo feeds worldwide began broadcasting series from the YFE catalog. The EMEA feed currently airs Albert Says... Nature Knows Best, Gloria's House, Urmel and Bob's Beach as a result of the swap. The United States/Latin America feed broadcasts Albert Says... Nature Knows Best, Urmel and Bob's Beach. The international kids' TV channels operated by YFE, Fix & Foxi and RiC, also begun to air some of ZooMoo's content, including their acquired animated series Jelly Jamm, as a result.

In 2021, ZooMoo was acquired by Rock Entertainment Holdings.

In 2022, ZooMoo was removed from Virgin Media On Demand, Same as Tiddlers TV, in the United Kingdom.

References

External links

ZooMoo on 7plus

Blue Ant Media channels
Puppetry
Television channels and stations established in 2014
Commercial-free television networks
Television in Singapore
Children's television channels in Ireland
Children's television channels in the United Kingdom
Children's television networks
English-language television stations in the United Kingdom
English-language television stations in Ireland
Mass media in Southeast Asia
English-language television stations in the Philippines
Children's television channels in the Philippines
Preschool education television networks